The copper-throated sunbird (Leptocoma calcostetha) is a species of bird in the family Nectariniidae.
It is found in Brunei, Cambodia, Indonesia, Malaysia, Myanmar, the Philippines, Thailand, and Vietnam.
Its natural habitat is subtropical or tropical mangrove forests.

Gallery

References

 

copper-throated sunbird
Birds of Southeast Asia
copper-throated sunbird
Taxonomy articles created by Polbot